Khandala is a hill station in the Western Ghats in the state of Maharashtra, India, about  from Lonavala, 12 kilometres from Khopoli and  from Karjat.

Khandala is located at the top end of the Bhor Ghat, a major ghat (meaning valley in Marathi) on the road link between the Deccan Plateau and the Konkan plain. The ghat carries an extensive amount of road and rail traffic. The Mumbai-Pune Expressway, the main link between the major cities of Mumbai and Pune, passes through Khandala.

Due to the ease of accessibility from nearby cities, Khandala is a common area for hiking. One destination is the nearby peak of Duke's Nose, which offers a panoramic view of Khandala and the Bhor Ghat.

The route near Khandala sunset point and khopoli has been there since centuries used to connect the coastal cities like Sopara to Pune. The transport from base of khopoli was by carts both hand pulled and horse drawn, which was tarred during British time somewhere in 1840.

The railway route from Karjat to Pune was started under the guidance of Great Indian Peninsula Railway Chief Engineer 1849–1862: James Berkley (surveyor and route designer). The chief Engineer had a bungalow near the current day st Xaviers Villa in Khandala facing towards Duke's nose hill, The construction of the Khandala tunnel was a herculean job as the tunnel had to be bored through basalt. There were four bouts of cholera in Khandala during the construction of the Tunnels and Khandala Railway station, Which is well documented by the paper published by sir James Berkley.

The other notable place of visit is the Ancient Jail which was built in 1896, in which founders of St Xaviers college were jailed as POWs by the British rulers.

Climate

Winter has warm days and cold nights, summer has hot days and cool to pleasant nights, while the monsoon has chilly days and chilly nights.
Summer starts in late March and ends in late May/early June, the monsoon starts in June and ends in mid October, while winter starts in late October and gets over in mid March.
Even at the height of summer (which is often April, not May) nights are reasonably cool.
Rain falls nearly everyday from June to September, with May, November and sometimes even April having showers.
May is much cooler than April.
Months from hottest to coldest.
April, May, March, October, June, ,September  , November , August, February, December, January.

Places of interest 
Tiger's Leap:   
It is one of the most fascinating places in this area. If someone carefully observes the valley from this point, it will appear as if a tiger is leaping into the valley.

Amrutanjan Point: 
Amrutanjan point is yet another point located high up in Khandala. It provides excellent view of the places nearby. The point is a well suited location for an enormous sight of the valley as well as the Duke's Nose.

Duke's Nose:
Duke's Nose, also known as 'Nagfani' (मराठी: नागफणी) meaning Cobra Head is named after Duke of Wellington, who had a pointed nose resembling the cliff. A very popular place for trekking, valley crossing, rock climbing & rappelling. It is a 2506 ft. tall straight cliff which every rock climber aspires to conquer. One needs to trek from southern side to reach at the base station from where one is supposed to climb the actual 300 ft. high rock to the summit. One has to make a dangerous traverse of 1000 ft. to reach at the base station. This is a bolted multi-pitch climb consisting of 4 stations. The most challenging part of the climb is between 3rd & 4th station which is a 25 feet overhang (rock wall inclined beyond 90 degrees) where one can climb only with the support of hands & no possibility of foothold. It is strongly advised that the activity is not to be undertaken without expert monitoring & guidance. The co-ordinates of the location:

18°44'30"N  73°21'32"E

Karla and Bhaja Cave:   
Karla and Bhaja Caves are historical rock cut caves, situated at a distance of 16 km from Khandala. Karla Caves are the ancient Buddhist caves. Bhaja Caves are similar to Karla Caves but are on a much smaller scale. This caves are also in Chaitya style.

Bhushi Lake: 
Bhushi Lake situated in Khandala is the ideal spot for all those who wish to relax in the lap of Mother Nature. Its serene and tranquil surroundings and crystal clear water provides immense opportunities for the tourists to rest in peace.

Gallery

In popular culture

 The town was mentioned in a popular song from the Hindi film Ghulam (1998) named "Aati kya Khandala?" ("Will you come to Khandala?")

 Ashok Kumar's character in the 1975 classic Chhoti Si Baat is a retired army Colonel that lives in Khandala.

See also
Khandala railway station
Bhor Ghat
Lonavala
 Kohinoor-IMI School of Hospitality Management

References

External links
Paper on the (GIPR) Thul Ghaut Railway incline:  By James John Berkley: GIPR Chief Engineer, Bombay, 1860.
Reminiscences of an old English Civil Engineer 1859 -1905  Brereton's account of working on the GIPR

Khandala-area hiking maps

lonavala Khandala sightseeing

Lonavala-Khandala